Teslui may refer to several places in Romania:

 Teslui, Dolj, a commune in Dolj County
 Teslui, Olt, a commune in Olt County
 Teslui (river), a tributary of the Olt in Dolj and Olt Counties